The Sheriff's Prisoner is a 1912 American short silent Western film starring Robyn Adair and Mary Ryan, a popular stage actress making her motion picture debut. The Lubin Manufacturing Company produced with release by the General Film Company.

Cast
 Robyn Adair as Bob Stern, the Prospector
 Mary Ryan 
 George Clancey as Sheriff Clancey

References

External links
 

1912 films
1912 Western (genre) films
1912 lost films
American black-and-white films
American silent short films
Lost Western (genre) films
Lost American films
Lubin Manufacturing Company films
Silent American Western (genre) films
1910s American films